Lisa Frey (born 16 February 1995) is a Swiss female handballer for HSG Blomberg-Lippe in the Frauen Handball-Bundesliga and the Swiss national team.

Frey made her official debut on the Swiss national team on 4 October 2012, against Austria. She represented Switzerland for the first time at the 2022 European Women's Handball Championship in Slovenia, Montenegro and North Macedonia.

Achievements
 SPAR Premium League
Winner: 2016, 2018
 Schweizer Cupsieger
Winner: 2013, 2018

References

External links

1995 births
Living people
Swiss female handball players
People from Aarau
21st-century Swiss women
Expatriate handball players
Swiss expatriate sportspeople in Germany
Swiss expatriate sportspeople in Denmark